Isabellah Andersson (born Isabellah Moraa Amoro on 12 November 1980 in Kenya) is a Swedish-Kenyan distance runner. She resides in Vilshult in Sweden, and since May 2009 is a Swedish citizen. She competes for the club Hässelby SK.

Career
Andersson became the new Swedish marathon record holder on 22 January 2010 when she placed fifth in the Dubai Marathon with a time of 2:26:52. On 31 October 2010, she finished fourth in the Frankfurt Marathon with a time of 2:25:10 hours, thus setting a new national record. She has won the Stockholm Marathon four times in a row. She ran at the 2011 Dubai Marathon and came in third, improving her record time to 2:23:41 hours. At the 2011 World Championships, she came in seventh. At the 2012 Summer Olympics, she finished eighteenth.

She originally came to Sweden to learn more about the sport foot orienteering.  There, she met Lars Andersson, a foot orienteering enthusiast and competitor. The two married in October 2006 and have a daughter Beyoncé (born 2009), named after the American singer Beyoncé Knowles.

On 10 April 2016, due to leg pain, she had to forfeit participating in the Rotterdam Marathon in the Netherlands.  This, in turn, led to her missing the 2016 Olympic Summer Games in Rio de Janeiro, Brazil.

Achievements
Etape Bornholm -- 2009 - victory and Swedish record in 10 km event
Stockholm Marathon -- 2008 - victory; 2009 - victory; 2010 - victory; 2011 - victory; 2013 - victory; 2014 - victory.
Göteborgsvarvet -- 2008 - 2nd place; 2009 - 2nd place; 2010 - 2nd place
Terräng-SM/Cross country championships -- 2008 - placed first in both the 4 km and 8 km events
Lidingöloppet -- 2007 - placed first in 30 km event
2010 European Athletics Championships, Barcelona—in marathon, placed 3rd and earned bronze medal, with a time of 2:34:43

Personal bests
5000 m - 15:45.08 - SM, Malmo 2009
10 000 m - 33:15.25 - Stockholm, 2013
10 km road - 32:24 - Etape Bornholm, 2009, Swedish record
Half marathon - 1:10:02 - "Venloop" in Dutch Venlo in 2010, Swedish record
Marathon - 2:23:41 - Dubai Marathon, 2011, Swedish record

References

External links

Official website
IAAF Profile

1980 births
Living people
Kenyan emigrants to Sweden
Swedish female long-distance runners
Swedish female marathon runners
Kenyan female long-distance runners
Kenyan female marathon runners
Athletes (track and field) at the 2012 Summer Olympics
Olympic athletes of Sweden
European Athletics Championships medalists